Knowles Taylor: 1835-1837
Valentine Hicks: 1837-1838
Waldron B. Post: 1838-1839
George B. Fisk: 1839-1847
James H. Weeks: 1847-1850
Isaac E. Haviland: 1850-1851
Moses Maynard, Jr.: 1851-1852
Isaac E. Haviland: 1852-1853
William E. Morris: 1853-1862
Coffin Colket: 1862-1863
Oliver Charlick: 1863-1875
 Henry Havemeyer: 1875-1876
Conrad Poppenhusen: 1876
David N. Ropes: 1876-1877
Adolph Poppenhusen: 1877
Thomas R. Sharp: 1877-1881
Austin Corbin: 1881-1896
William H. Baldwin: 1896-1905
William F. Potter: 1905
Ralph Peters: 1905-1923
Samuel Rea: 1923-1928
The LIRR was operated by the Pennsylvania Railroad from 1928 to 1949. The people from Smucker and Delatour through Wyer were trustees rather than presidents, as the LIRR was in Chapter 77 bankruptcy.
David E. Smucker and H.L. Delatour: 1949-1950
William H. Draper: 1950-1951
William Wyer: 1951-1954
Walter S. Franklin: 1954-1955
Thomas M. Goodfellow: 1955-1967
Frank Aikman, Jr.: 1967-1969
Walter L. Schlager, Jr.: 1969-1976
Robert K. Pattison: 1976-1978
Francis S. Gabreski: 1978-1981
Daniel T. Scannell: 1981
Robin H.H. Wilson: 1981-1985
Bruce C. McIver: 1985-1989
Charles W. Hoppe: 1990-1994
Thomas F. Prendergast: 1994-2000
Kenneth J. Bauer: 2000-2003
James J. Dermody: 2003-2006
Raymond P. Kenny (acting): 2006-2007
Helena Williams: 2007-2014
Patrick Nowakowski: 2014-2018
Philip Eng: 2018-2022
Catherine Rinaldi (interim): 2022-present

References

Presidents